This article lists the presidents of the Parliament of Navarre, the regional legislature of Navarre.

Presidents

References

Navarre